Mercedes de Oriente is a municipality in the Honduran department of La Paz.

Demographics
At the time of the 2013 Honduras census, Mercedes de Oriente municipality had a population of 1,087. Of these, 93.01% were Indigenous, 6.81% Mestizo and 0.18% Black or Afro-Honduran.

References

Municipalities of the La Paz Department (Honduras)